Victor David Díaz (born February 4, 1968 in Caracas, [Distrito Capital (state)) is a basketball player from Venezuela who last played with Gaiteros B.B.C. He holds the record for the most Fiba games in history(1,126).He participated with the Venezuela national basketball team at the 1992 Summer Olympics (11th), the 2002 FIBA World Championship Where he was the second top scorer of the Championship (14th) and the 2006 FIBA World Championship (21st), where he averaged 11 points per game.  Diaz is a 6'6"

References
 FIBA profile
 RealGM profile
 Latinbasket profile

1968 births
Living people
Basketball players at the 1992 Summer Olympics
Guaros de Lara (basketball) players
Independiente de General Pico basketball players
Marinos B.B.C. players
Olympic basketball players of Venezuela
People from Lara (state)
Small forwards
Venezuelan expatriate basketball people in Brazil
Venezuelan men's basketball players
2006 FIBA World Championship players
2002 FIBA World Championship players